S. Thomas' College, Bandarawela is a selective entry boys' private school, situated in the town of Bandarawela in the Uva Province, Sri Lanka.  It is an Anglican school administrated by the Church of Ceylon.

The college is a branch of S. Thomas' College, Mount Lavinia, which is under the Anglican Church of Ceylon, is run by a Board of Governors which is chaired by the Anglican Bishop of Colombo, who is also known as the "Visitor of the College". The administration of the college in itself is headed by a headmaster who is an Anglican priest. Admission to the college is at the sole discretion of the headmaster.

History
S. Thomas' College was founded as a preparatory school in 1942 by W. T. Keble.

Sports

Uva Thomian Cricket Encounter 
This annual cricket encounter between S. Thomas' College, Bandarawela and S. Thomas' College, Gurutalawa, both being part of the Thomian family, was started in 1984. The fixture was abandoned in 1987 due to a number of reasons. The fixture was resumed after the idea was mooted by the OBA of STC Bandarawela supported by the OBA of STC Gurutalawa and the two Headmasters agreed to continue the ‘Uva Thomian Cricket Encounter’ (UTCE) on a grand scale in 2009. The match is played for a trophy to commemorate the two headmasters of Bandarawela and Gurutalawa who were responsible for starting the fixture; S. L. A. Ratnayake and Patrick Gunawardene.

W. T. Keble Memorial Soccer Tournament 
This annual inter-school W.T. Keble Memorial Soccer Tournament takes place between S. Thomas' College, Bandarawela and S. Thomas' Preparatory School, Kollupitiya, both being part of the Thomian family.

Past headmasters

Old Boy's Association 
The Old Boy's Association (OBA) of S.T.C. Bandarawela was inaugurated in 1977 during the tenure of S. L. A. Ratnayake. The Colombo branch was inaugurated in the year 1990 and both were amalgamated and thus the main body now operates from Colombo. The OBA of STCB has continued to function as an effective mechanism to support the development of the school.

See also 
 List of schools in Sri Lanka

References

External links
 
 Thomian Walkathon 2015
 Stps Bandarawela in the early years
 Diocesan Institutes : S. Thomas' College, Bandarawela

Church of Ceylon schools in the Diocese of Colombo
Educational institutions established in 1942
Private schools in Sri Lanka
Schools in Bandarawela
1942 establishments in Ceylon